"Akanamali" is a  song recorded  by South African DJ and music producer  Sun-El Musician featuring South African singer-songwriter Samthing Soweto. EL World  Music and Sony released it on 21 May 2017, as the lead single from his debut studio album, Africa to the World (2018).

It reached number one on Shazam charts, becoming the first single from  the album to reach summit  of the chart. Sun-El Musician released Extended Mix version of the song on 17 July 2021. The song's lyrics discuss a lady who runs away with a guy who has no money, to finds her happiness. "Akanamali" was certified  platinum by the Recording Industry of  South Africa (RiSA).

At the 24th ceremony of  South African Music Awards the song won three awards includes: Best Collaboration, Highest Airplay Composer  and Highest Airplay Song.

Background 
"Akanamali" marks first collaboration with Samthing Soweto. The song was produced by Sun-El Musician.

Composition 
The song lasts for 5 minutes and 22 seconds, composed using common time in the key D♭ minor, having a tempo of 105 beats.

"Akanamali" addresses a lady who runs away with a guy who has no money, to finds her happiness.

Music video 
The music video for "Akanamali" was released in 2018, filmed in Soweto, South Africa.

Live performances 
The song was first performed live at Huawei Joburg  Day in 2018 by Samthing Soweto and Sun-El Musician.

Charts

Weekly charts

Certifications

Accolades 
At the 24th South African Music Awards "Akanamali" won three accolades.

|-
| rowspan="3" |2018
| rowspan="3" |"Akanamali"
| Best Collaboration
|
|-
|Highest Airplay Composer
|
|-
||Highest Airplay Song
|

Release history

References 

2017 singles
2017 songs
Zulu-language songs